The 2023 Recopa Gaúcha was 10th edition of an annual football match contested by the winners of the Campeonato Gaúcho and the Copa FGF in the previous season. The competition is considered a Super Cup of football in Rio Grande do Sul, being organized by FGF. 

The current holders are Grêmio, and they will be able to defend his title by winning the 2022 Campeonato Gaúcho. Their opponent is São Luiz from the city of Ijuí, winners of the 2022 edition of the Copa FGF.

The event received worldwide attention due the debut of Luis Suárez on Grêmio. The match had an attendance of 49,614.

Teams

Notes

References

Football competitions in Rio Grande do Sul
2022 in Brazilian football
Recopa Gaúcha
Grêmio Foot-Ball Porto Alegrense matches